The 1st Winfield Junior Club Formula 2 Race was a non-championship Formula Two motor race held at Charterhall on 23 May 1953. The race was won by Ken Wharton in a Cooper T23-Bristol. Bobbie Baird was second in a Ferrari 500 and Jimmy Stewart third in a Cooper T20-Bristol.

Results

References

Winfield
Winfield
Winfield
Winfield